Dmitriy Aleksandrovich Petelin (Russian Cyrillic: Дмитрий Александрович Петелин; born July 10, 1983, in Kustanai, Kazakh SSR, now Kazakhstan) is a Russian cosmonaut who was part of the 2012 selection group.

He flew to the ISS in September 2022 with Soyuz MS-22 and is expected to return to Earth after 9 months with Soyuz MS-23, due to MS-22 spacecraft being damaged while in space.

Biography
Petelin graduated from the South Ural State University in 2006 with a degree in aircraft and helicopter engineering.  Following graduation, he worked as an engineer for NIK, LLC.  On October 26, 2012, he became a cosmonaut and reported to the Yuri Gagarin Cosmonaut Training Center.  He completed cosmonaut training and was named a test cosmonaut on July 15, 2014.

He is married and has one daughter.

External links

 Astronaut.ru biography
 Roscosmos biography
 Spacefacts biography

Living people
1983 births
Russian cosmonauts
Spacewalkers